Vice Admiral Awwad Eid Al-Aradi Al-Balawi, is the former Director General of Saudi Arabian Border Guards, Ministry of Interior (Kingdom of Saudi Arabia).

Early life and career 
Vice Admiral Al-Aradi obtained Master of Science in Maritime Management from WMU, Sweden (GMAI 1988). He graduated from Pakistan Naval Academy, Karachi.

 Commander of The Security Unit of King Abdul Aziz seaport
 Director of Military Operations Dept. in the Eastern Region
 Director of the General Directorate of Maritime logistics Support in Maritime Affairs – Riyadh
 Assistant Director General for Maritime Affairs
 Deputy Director General of Border Guard
 Director General of Border Guard (Appointed on 19 Aug 2014)
 Promoted to vice admiral (14 July 2016)

He was appointed as the chairman of the first International Symposium on Land and Maritime Border Security and Safety in Jeddah and the Chairman of the Scientific Committee. Vice Admiral Al-Balawi is the delegate of Saudi Arabia to the International Maritime Organisation (IMO) and is a part of the council and the board.  He has chaired several high-level meetings of signatories resulting in ‘Jeddah Amendment to Djibouti Code of Conduct 2017, and revisions of the code of conduct for the repression of piracy, armed robbery against ships and illicit maritime activity in the western Indian Ocean and the Gulf of Aden Area. He has also been the chairman of standing committee for the management of maritime disasters.

Honour and recognition 

 The award of Excellence in the domain of Border Security and Safety at the National Security Middle East Conference held in Abu Dhabi-UAE(28-29 August 2016) 
 Awarded the rank and dignity of knight of the National order of June from Djiboutian Prime Minister Abdulkader Kamil Mohamed for his outstanding service and assistance given to Djiboutian Coast Guard and support to DCoC's signatory states.
 1st Class King Faisal Medal (7 September 2017)

References 

1955 births
Living people
Saudi Arabian military personnel
Saudi Arabia and the United Nations